Arpara Union is a union parishad situated at Shalikha Upazila,  in Magura District, Khulna Division of Bangladesh. There are 7 villages and 7 mouzas in the union.

References

External links
 

Unions of Khulna Division
Unions of Shalikha Upazila
Unions of Magura District